Andrew Masterson (born 1961 in the United Kingdom) is an Australian author of crime fiction, horror and non-fiction.  Masterson emigrated from the UK to Australia in 1968.  He has worked as a journalist since 1984 in a number of countries, including Australia, the UK, Germany and the United States. He has a teenager named Cato, and a wife named Sahm.

Awards 

Ned Kelly Awards for Crime Writing, Best first crime novel, 1999: winner for The Last Days : the apocryphon of Joe Panther 
Aurealis Awards for Excellence in Australian Speculative Fiction, Science Fiction Division, Best Novel, 1999: shortlisted for The Letter Girl 
Ned Kelly Awards Awards for Crime Writing, Best Crime Novel, 2001: joint winner for The Second Coming : the passion of Joe Panther

Bibliography

Novels 

The Last Days: the Apocryphon of Joe Panther (1998)
The Letter Girl (1999)
The Second Coming: the Passion of Joe Panther (2000)
Death of the Author (2001)

Non-fiction 

Pop, Print & Publicity (1997)
Bosstrology: a guide to the twelve bastard bosses of the Zodiac (1997) with Adele Lang
Rocking in the Real World: an introduction to the music industry in Australia (1998) with Sue Gillard
Alcorobics: fitness and harmony through drinking (2003)

References 

20th-century Australian novelists
21st-century Australian novelists
Australian crime writers
Australian male novelists
Australian non-fiction writers
1961 births
Living people
Ned Kelly Award winners
20th-century Australian male writers
21st-century Australian male writers
Male non-fiction writers